Casein kinase II subunit alpha is an enzyme that in humans is encoded by the CSNK2A1 gene.

Casein kinase II is a serine/threonine protein kinase that phosphorylates acidic proteins such as casein.  The kinase exists as a tetramer and is composed of an alpha, an alpha-prime, and two beta subunits. The alpha subunits contain the catalytic activity while the beta subunits undergo autophosphorylation. The protein encoded by this gene represents the alpha subunit. While this gene is found on chromosome 20, a related transcribed pseudogene is found on chromosome 11. Three transcript variants encoding two different proteins have been found for this gene.

Interactions 

Casein kinase 2, alpha 1 has been shown to interact with:

 APC, 
 ATF1, 
 ATF2, 
 C-Fos, 
 C-jun,
 CDC25B, 
 CHEK1, 
 CREBBP, 
 CSNK2B, 
 DDIT3, 
 FGF1, 
 FGF2, 
 HNRPA2B1 
 MAPK14, 
 PIN1, 
 PLEKHO1, 
 PTEN, 
 RELA, 
 TAF1,  and
 UBTF.

References

Further reading